The Garden of Unearthly Delights is the eighth full-length album by the British doom metal band Cathedral. It was released on 26 January 2006. The album title is inspired by the Hieronymous Bosch painting The Garden of Earthly Delights. The album was recorded at New Rising Studios and produced by Warren Riker.

The limited-edition digipak version of this album contains an apple-shaped Sniffle Disc CD that emits the smell of an apple when rubbed on the label side or heated during playback in a CD or CD-ROM player.

Track listing 

"Proga-Europa" begins with 5:01 of silence. The last 0:57 make up the hidden track.

Personnel 
Lee Dorian – vocals, samples
Garry Jennings – guitar, acoustic guitar, percussion
Brian Dixon – drums, percussion
Leo Smee – bass, mellotron, flute, synthesizers, auto harp
Warren Riker – recording and producing
Dave Patchett – cover art
Lo Polidoro – female vocals

References 

2006 albums
Cathedral (band) albums